The Baregg Tunnel is a motorway tunnel near the city of Baden in Swiss canton of Aargau, which forms part of the A1 motorway between western Switzerland and Zürich. The tunnel comprises three bores through Baregg, built at two different times.

Since the opening of the third bore, the four lanes of the original two bores are used for eastbound traffic, whilst the new bore's three lanes are used for westbound traffic.

References

External links
 

Road tunnels in Switzerland
Buildings and structures in Aargau
Tunnels completed in 2003